The Virginias  (sometimes also known as the two Virginias) is a region in the United States comprising the U.S. states of Virginia and West Virginia. If they were a single state (as they were until the Civil War), the Virginias would have a combined population of 10,425,109 as of 2020 United States census. This would give Virginia the 10th-largest population of any state, with 14,000 people less than the 9th, North Carolina. The total area of the two states is about 175,000 square kilometers (67,000 square miles).

Vexit 
Vexit is a proposed measure for Second Amendment sanctuary counties in Virginia to secede and join the neighboring, more conservative West Virginia over the issue of gun legislation.

See also
The Californias
The Canadas
The Carolinas
The Dakotas
The Floridas
History of Virginia

Divided regions

History of Virginia
Geography of Virginia
Geography of West Virginia
Regions of the Southern United States

References